Smyrna is the former name of Izmir, Turkey.

Smyrna may also refer to:

In Greek mythology
 Myrrha, also known as Smyrna, mother of Adonis
 Smyrna (Amazon), a mythical eponym of a quarter in Ephesus

Historical figures
 Bion of Smyrna (c. 100 BC), Greek poet
 Chaka of Smyrna, 11th century Turkish emir 
 Chrysostomos of Smyrna (Chrysostomos Kalafatis) (1867–1922), Greek Orthodox bishop of Izmir
 Hermippus of Smyrna (3rd century BC), Peripatetic philosopher
 Nymphidianus of Smyrna (4th century), Neoplatonist and sophist who lived in the time of the emperor Julian
 Theon of Smyrna (c. 70–c. 135), Greek philosopher

Place names
 Myrina (Aeolis),  called Smyrna in antiquity

United States
Smyrna, Delaware, population 10,000.
New Smyrna Beach, Florida
Smyrna, Georgia, population 57,000.
Smyrna, Decatur County, Indiana, an unincorporated community in Salt Creek Township.
Smyrna, Jefferson County, Indiana, an unincorporated community also called Creswell.
Smyrna, Louisville, Kentucky, a neighborhood.
Smyrna, Maine
Smyrna, Michigan, an unincorporated community in Otisco Township.
Smyrna, Nebraska, an unincorporated community in Nuckolls County.
Smyrna (town), New York
Smyrna (village), New York
Smyrna, North Carolina, in Carteret County
Smyrna, South Carolina
Smyrna, Tennessee, population 50,000.
Smyrna Airport (Tennessee)
Smyrna High School (Tennessee)
Smyrna, Washington, an unincorporated community in Grant County.

Other uses
 SmY RNA, a family of small nuclear RNAs found in some species of nematode worms
 Smyrna (butterfly), a genus of brush-footed butterflies

See also
 
 New Smyrna (disambiguation)
 Nea Smyrni
 Burning of Smyrna